The black-tailed myiobius or black-tailed flycatcher (Myiobius atricaudus) is a species of passerine bird in the family Tityridae. It was previously placed in the family Tyrannidae. Black-tailed flycatchers are found in Brazil, Colombia, Costa Rica, Ecuador, Panama, Peru, and Venezuela. Their natural habitats are subtropical or tropical moist lowland forests and heavily degraded former forest. They are usually found alone or in pairs, but may join flocks of several species.

Subspecies
Seven subspecies are recognised; M. a. atricaudus from southwestern Costa Rica, Panama and western Colombia; M. a. portovelae from western Ecuador and northwestern Peru; M. a. modestus from eastern Venezuela; M. a. adjacens from southern Colombia, eastern Ecuador, eastern Peru and western Brazil; M. a. connectens from northeastern Brazil south of the River Amazon; M. a. snethlagei from northeastern and eastern Brazil; M. a. ridgwayi from southeastern Brazil.

Description
The black-tailed myiobius closely resembles the whiskered myiobius (M. barbatus) and the sulphur-rumped myiobius (M. sulphureipygius) in appearance, with olive upper parts and a yellow rump. The underparts differ in being buff rather than tawny or greyish-olive, but birds living in eastern Brazil tend to have yellowish or yellowish-buff underparts. Another distinguishing feature is the location in which the bird is seen.

Distribution and habitat
The species has a patchy distribution in tropical Central and South America. It is present in Costa Rica, Panama, Colombia, Venezuela, Ecuador, Peru (on both sides of the Andes) and large parts of Brazil. Where their ranges overlap, it is generally found in drier habitats than the whiskered myiobius (M. barbatus), and at higher elevations. It generally frequents forest verges and secondary growth, often near water, whereas the whiskered myiobius prefers the interior of forests.

Status
Destruction of the Amazon rainforest is reducing the area of suitable habitat for this bird and its numbers are thought to be in decline. It is an uncommon species with a patchy distribution, nevertheless, it has a very wide range and the total population size is likely to be large; as a result, the International Union for Conservation of Nature has classified it as being of "least concern.

References

Further reading

black-tailed myiobius
Birds of Costa Rica
Birds of Panama
Birds of Colombia
Birds of Venezuela
Birds of Ecuador
Birds of the Amazon Basin
Birds of Brazil
Birds of the Atlantic Forest
black-tailed myiobius
Taxonomy articles created by Polbot